The Coalition of the Pleasant Scent of Servitude, the Sweet Scent of Servitude or the Joyful Essence of Obedience was a conservative political group in Iran that supported Mahmoud Ahmadinejad and his government.

2006 local elections 
The group was founded a few months before the 2006 Iranian local elections, and was able to win seats in several City and Village Councils of Iran. They had no candidates in Ilam, Sari, Kerman, Gorgan and Khorramabad. According to Fars News Agency, the results were as follows:

Parliament elections

2008 
They competed in the 2008 Iranian legislative election as part of United Front of Conservatives. After the elections, their winning candidates formed a new Parliamentary group named "Islamic Revolution", claiming to have 90 members.

2012 
In 2010, some reports indicated a dispute inside the group, and in the 2012 Iranian legislative election, some members formed Stability Front, claiming not to support the followers of Ahmadinejad. Another newly formed group called Monotheism and Justice Front, was linked to Esfandiar Rahim Mashaei and Mahmoud Ahmadinejad.

References

External links 
Electoral lists 
 2006 City Council of Tehran election
 2006 City Councils of Conties elections

Principlist political groups in Iran
Political parties established in 2006
Political parties disestablished in 2011
Populism in Iran